Patrick Weiser (born 25 December 1971) is a German former professional footballer who played both as a midfielder and as a defender. Since retiring from playing he has entered coaching.

Club career
Weiser began his professional career with 1. FC Köln whom he had joined aged 13. He made his first team debut on 11 April 1992 in a 3–1 win at MSV Duisburg and became a regular player during the following season.

After making 110 appearances for 1. FC Köln over six seasons, he departed for France in July 1997, joining Rennes. He was a mainstay of their starting XI during his first Ligue 1 campaign, but the arrival of Paul Le Guen as manager saw his appearances during the 1998–99 season become more limited.

He returned to Germany to sign for VfL Wolfsburg and begin a six-year association with the club. He played 159 league games for the club during this period, and also featured in several UEFA Cup campaigns. During this time he switched to playing more predominantly as a defender than as midfielder.

In August 2005, Weiser returned to his former club 1. FC Köln, signing a two-year deal. He only made a handful of appearances for the club though during their campaign in the league, DFB Cup and Intertoto Cup.

Managerial career
After retiring from playing he became a coach at under 16 level for 1. FC Köln in 2009, and later became assistant coach of the first team for the 2011–12 season.

In October 2012, he moved to the role of head coach at English club Wolverhampton Wanderers, where he reunited with Ståle Solbakken who he had previously been assistant to at 1. FC Köln. However, Weiser was sacked along with Solbakken in January 2013.

Personal life
His son Mitchell (born 1994) is also a professional footballer.

References

External links

1971 births
Living people
German footballers
Association football defenders
Association football midfielders
Germany B international footballers
Bundesliga players
Ligue 1 players
1. FC Köln players
1. FC Köln II players
Stade Rennais F.C. players
VfL Wolfsburg players
Wolverhampton Wanderers F.C. non-playing staff
German expatriate footballers
German expatriate sportspeople in France
Expatriate footballers in France
People from Düren
Sportspeople from Cologne (region)
Footballers from North Rhine-Westphalia